The ENNIE Awards (previously stylized as ENnie Awards) are awards for role-playing game (RPG) products (including game-related accessories, publications, and art) and their creators. The awards were created in 2001 by Russ Morrissey of EN World in partnership with Eric Noah's Unofficial D&D Third Edition News. The ceremony has been hosted at Gen Con in Indianapolis since 2002. Since 2018, EN World is no longer associated with the awards. 

The ENNIES comprise two rounds. In the first round, publishers submit their products for nomination. Entries are judged by five democratically elected judges. The nominated products are voted on by the public in the second round. Winners of the annual awards are then announced at a ceremony at Gen Con.

History
The award ceremony initially focused on the d20 System products and publishers. It has come to include "all games, supplements, and peripheral enterprises". Since 2002, the awards have been announced at a live ceremony at Gen Con. It is now considered a "signature part" of the convention. Author George R. R. Martin referred to the ENNIE Awards as "the most prestigious honors in role-playing" in 2010.

The nominees are chosen by a panel of judges, and the winners are voted on by the public and presented at an award show done in collaboration between Gen Con and EN World.

In 2007, the ENNIES were sponsored by the corporation Your Games Now, followed by Avatar Art in 2008. In 2010, 2011, and 2012, they were sponsored by both Indie Press Revolution and DriveThruRPG. From 2013 to 2016, they were sponsored by DriveThruRPG alone. In 2015, Campaign Coins made the medals as a sponsorship; Lone Wolf Development became a sponsor in 2017. The awards were run and owned by Morrissey until 2019.

In 2015, the awards disqualified the unofficially licensed Mass Effect RPG for copyright violations.

In 2020, Massif Press withdrew its RPG Lancer from the competition over a 2017 controversy. Charlie Hall commented for Polygon in 2020:

Winners by year
The categories change yearly, depending on the nominations.

2001 ENnie Award winners
2002 ENnie Award winners
2003 ENnie Award winners
2004 ENnie Award winners
2005 ENnie Award winners
2006 ENnie Award winners
2007 ENnie Award winners
2008 ENnie Award winners
2009 ENnie Award winners
2010 ENnie Award winners
2011 ENnie Award winners
2012 ENnie Award winners
2013 ENnie Award winners
2014 ENnie Award winners
2015 ENnie Award winners
2016 ENnie Award winners
2017 ENnie Award winners
2018 ENnie Award winners
2019 ENnie Award winners
2020 ENnie Award winners
2021 ENnie Award winners
2022 ENNIE Award winners

References

External links
ENNIE Awards Official Page

Game awards
Awards established in 2001